Anadasmus arenosa is a moth of the family Depressariidae. It is found in French Guiana.

The wingspan is about 30 mm. The forewings are light ochreous with the plical and second discal stigmata minute and blackish. The hindwings are pale brassy-yellowish.

References

Moths described in 1916
Anadasmus
Moths of South America